Lorenzo de Rodas (August 2, 1930 – December 18, 2011) was a Spanish actor and film director who participated in several telenovelas and Mexican movies.

Biography 
He was married to the actress María Idalia, who has a son named Leonardo Daniel who is also an actor.

He died on December 18, 2011 in Cuernavaca, Morelos, of natural causes.

Filmography

As actor

As director

References

External links 

1930 births
2011 deaths
Mexican male telenovela actors
Mexican directors
Mexican cinematographers
Spanish male actors
Spanish emigrants to Mexico